Here Comes Trouble is a compilation album of various recorded works by former Small Faces and Faces keyboardist Ian McLagan's solo career, featuring the entirety of his 1979 debut album and a 1985 extended play as well as bonus tracks from a variety of sources.

Track listing
All tracks composed by Ian McLagan, except where indicated.

 "La De La" (2:25)
 "Headlines" (3:00)
 "Truly" (Carl Levy) (5:58)
 "Somebody" (2:58)
 "Movin' Out" (3:52)
 "Little Troublemaker" (Johnny Lee Schell) (2:26)
 "If It's Alright" (2:00)
 "Sign" (McLagan, Schell) (3:24) 
 "Hold On" (3:43)
 "Mystifies Me" (Ron Wood) (5:25)

CD bonus tracks
"Last Chance to Dance" (McLagan, John Pidgeon) (3:53)
"All I Want Is You" (3:43)
"Big Love" (3:32)
"You're My Girl" (2:37) 
"Pictures of Lily" (Pete Townshend) (2:50)
"Truly" (Carl Levy) (11:46)
"Last Chance to Dance" (McLagan, Pidgeon) (3:37)

Participants
 Ian McLagan - vocals, Wurlitzer electric piano, Hammond B3 organ, acoustic and electric guitars
with

Guitarists
 Johnny Lee Schell - electric and acoustic guitars, vocals (1-2, 4-10)
 Ronnie Wood - guitar, tenor saxophone, vocals, recitation (3, 4, 15, 16)
 Keith Richards - guitar, vocals (3, 16)
 Paul Warren - guitars, bass (11-14)
 Matt Downs - guitar (15)
 "Scrappy" Jud Newcomb - guitar (17)

Bassists
 Paul Stallworth - bass (1-2, 4-10)
 Stanley Clarke - bass (3, 16)
 Phil Chen - bass (11)
 Will MacGregor - bass (15)
 Sarah Brown - bass (17)

Drummers
 Jim Keltner - drums (1-2, 4-8, 10)
 Zigaboo Modeliste - drums (3, 16)
 Ringo Starr - drums (9)
 David Kemper - drums (11-14)
 Nick Vincent - drums, vocals (15)
 Don Harvey - drums (17)

Miscellaneous
 Bobby Keys - tenor saxophone (3, 4, 5, 6, 10, 16)
 Darryl Keys - saxophone (3, 16)
 Steve Madaio - trumpet (4)
 Geoff Workman - accordion (9)
 Jaime Segal - vocals (10)
 Gurf Morlix - vocals (17)

Source Material
 Tracks 1-10 are from Troublemaker (1979)
 Tracks 11-14 are from Last Chance to Dance (1985)
 Track 15 is from a 1992 tribute CD to The Who.
 Track 16 is an unedited version of track 3.
 Track 17 is an outtake from the 1999 sessions for Best of British, issued on the Japanese version of that album.

Ian McLagan albums
2005 compilation albums
Albums produced by John Porter (musician)